Aspigonus is a genus of wasps belonging to the family Braconidae.

The genus was first described by Wesmael in 1835.

The species of this genus are found in Europe and Northern America.

Species:
 Aspigonus flavicornis (Nees, 1834)

References

Braconidae
Braconidae genera